Levensau is a river of Schleswig-Holstein, Germany. It is a tributary of the Kiel Canal near Neuwittenbek.

See also
List of rivers of Schleswig-Holstein

References

Rivers of Schleswig-Holstein
Rivers of Germany